Alopiopsis is an extinct genus of prehistoric sharks belonging to the family Carcharhinidae.

Fossil record
Fossils of Alopiopsis are found only at Monte Bolca (Pesciara) (Eocene of Italy) (age range: from : 48.6 to 40.4  million years ago.).

Species
 Alopiopsis cuvieri
 Alopiopsis plejodon Lioy 1865

See also

 List of prehistoric cartilaginous fish
 Prehistoric fish

References

Alopiopsis
Taxa named by Paolo Lioy
Prehistoric shark genera
Fossil taxa described in 1865